The 2002 ARCA Re/Max Series was the 50th season of the ARCA Racing Series, a division of the Automobile Racing Club of America (ARCA). The season began on February 10, 2002, with the Discount Auto Parts 200 at Daytona International Speedway. The season ended with the EasyCare Vehicle Services Contract 200 at Lowe's Motor Speedway on October 11. Frank Kimmel won the drivers championship, his fourth in the series and third in a row, and Chad Blount won the Rookie of the Year award.

References

ARCA Menards Series
Automobile Racing Club of America